Gyre (T-AGOR-21), best known as RV Gyre, was the lead ship of  her class of oceanographic research ships acquired by the U.S. Navy in 1973 for assignment to the University-National Oceanographic Laboratory System (UNOLS) fleet of Navy owned ships. Gyre was operated by the Texas A&M University School of Oceanography as part of the Navy owned UNOLS fleet until stricken 17 August 1992 and transferred to the university under a program transferring ships to states, schools and other public institutions. The university operated the ship until sale in December 2005.

Gyre was purchased by TDI-Brooks International, Inc., flagged in Vanuatu, Port Vila and operated as a for hire research and survey vessel with particular suitability for undersea oil and gas related work.

Construction & characteristics
Gyre was built in New Orleans, LA, by Halter Marine, Inc. and was laid down on 9 October 1972 and launched on 23 May 1973. She was delivered to the Navy 14 November 1973 and placed in service as RV Gyre (T-AGOR-21). The ship was the lead of the AGOR-21 class research vessels. The class was to be specifically designed to reduce cost of both acquisition and life cycle costs by adopting commercial standards and practices in design.

The ship was  length overall,  beam,  draft,  with a displacement tonnage of 946. Gyre had a hydraulic electric bow thruster. The ship was operated with five officers and five crew with a scientific complement of twenty-three.

Gyre had wet and dry laboratories with a capability to carry an  instrument van on deck. For equipment handling and operation there were two "A" frames of  capacity, two cranes with  capacity and three oceanographic/hydrographic/trawl winches. Raytheon shallow and deep water sounding systems were installed and the ship had a capability for seismic profiling.

University assignment
Gyre was leased to the Texas A&M University School of Oceanography as part of the University-National Oceanographic Laboratory System (UNOLS) fleet of Navy owned ships, based in Galveston operating with call sign KJCL. The ship had undergone modifications in 1980 and 1984 and then struck from Navy list in August 1992. The university acquired the vessel by transfer from the Navy and continued to operate Gyre as part of the UNOLS fleet with National Science Foundation (NSF) support for research. The vessel was sold in December 2005.

Operations
The university operated Gyre until 31 August 2005. At that time maintenance of an older ship and federal research budget cuts for research made operation uneconomical. The university was left without a ship capable of carrying twenty-three researchers and sustained voyages in the Western Gulf of Mexico. In 2005 Gyre only made nine cruises with 76 total days at sea compared to fifteen and 194 days at sea in 2000. The 2000 operations involved ten days in support of NSF requirements with the rest supporting state, Navy, Minerals Management Service (MMS), and other authorized federal and private projects. The MMS used Gyre as the research platform for The Deep Gulf of Mexico Benthos (DGoMB) project studying impact of oil and gas operations on the sea floor biota.

Commercial operation
Gyre is currently operated by TDI-Brooks International, Inc., College Station, Texas, flagged in Vanuatu, Port Vila advertised for work out of Mexico, Northern South America and West Africa. Gyre is identified with IMO number 7318999, MMSI number 577275000, and call sign YJYX5 and noted as particularly well suited for oil and gas exploration and off shore production support. The ship now has four laboratory or work spaces and quarters for nine crew and twenty six technical staff.

References

External links
 Cruise 1: R/V Gyre04G03 (Texas A&M, Cruise description with objectives, personnel)
 R/V Gyre (Recent photos, information and specifications)

Gyre-class oceanographic research ships
University-National Oceanographic Laboratory System research vessels
Texas A&M University
1973 ships